Q'illu Q'asa (Quechua q'illu yellow, q'asa mountain pass, "yellow mountain pass", hispanicized spelling Jellojasa) is a mountain in the Andes of Peru, about  high. It is located in the Apurímac Region, Abancay Province, on the border of the districts of Abancay and Tamburco. Q'illu Q'asa lies southeast of Ampay and west of a lake named Usphaqucha.

See also 
 Ampay National Sanctuary

References

Mountains of Peru
Mountains of Apurímac Region